First base is the position played by a first baseman in baseball.

First base may also refer to:

 Kissing, in baseball metaphors for sex
 First Base (group), a 1990s German Eurodance group
 First Base (album), a 1972 album by the English rock band Babe Ruth
 First Base (My Little Pony), a pony in the My Little Pony franchise